Keiga Jirru is an Eastern Sudanic language spoken in the Nuba Hills of Sudan.

There is no listing in Ethnologue nor Glottolog, as it was considered a dialect of the Tese language.

References

Temein languages (Roger Blench 2007)

External links
 Doni basic lexicon at the Global Lexicostatistical Database

Temein languages